Dance in Rotuma refers to the traditional and modern dance styles performed by the people of the island of Rotuma, which became a dependency of Fiji in 1881. Despite Rotuma's political and historical links with Fiji, the island's culture shows strong Polynesian influences, particularly from Samoa and Tonga, which, along with Fiji, feature strongly in the history and traditions of the Rotuman people.

However, the main styles of Rotuman dance, the Tautoga, the Mak Sa'moa and the Mak Rarotoga, show clearer influence from neighbouring cultures than most facets of the culture.

References

See also
Fara (Rotuman festivity)
List of dances

Dance of Rotuma
Fijian dance